Sembah is an Indonesian greeting and gesture as a way of demonstrating respect and reverence. While performing the sembah, the person clasped their palms together solemnly in a prayer-like fashion called suhun or susuhun in Javanese; or menyusun jari sepuluh ("to arrange the ten fingers") in Indonesian and Malay, and placed them in front of the chest, and moving the combined palms up to the chin, or all the way up until the thumbs touching the tip of the nose, while bowing slightly. Any of these two forms are made depending on the status of the person greeted.

Sembah is endemic and prevalent in Nusantara regional cultures that shares dharmic heritage — such as Balinese, Javanese, and Sundanese even as far as Malay as the testament of Indonesian Hindu-Buddhist past. It is cognate to the Cambodian  sampeah and Thai wai. All of these greetings are based on the Indian Añjali Mudrā used in namasté.

Etymology

In Indonesian and Malay, the term sembah means to pay the honour, obeisance, homage or to worship. It also the synonym with the Javanese word suhun. According to Indonesian writer Hamka in his book Dari Perbendaharaan Lama, the word derives from a Javanese word for position (susunan) of hands in reverential salutation, done with hands pressed together, palms touching and fingers pointed upwards, and bowing. This arrangement which has some similarities with Indian namaste is called "sembah", which is used to honor and praise. Thus "susuhunan" can refer to someone to give the "susunan" or "sembah" to, or a revered person. Another word for "susuhunan" is "sesembahan". The term sembah however, curiously sounds similar and cognate to Cambodian sampeah, which suggests their common origin or shared connections.

The word sembahyang in Indonesian and Malaysian Malay today is made synonymous with the Islamic salat ritual, means prayer or worship. — this comes from the merging of sembah itself with hyang (deity or holy spirits) thus meaning "hyang worship".

Origin

Pranāma or Namaste, the part of ancient Indian subcontinent culture has propagated to southeast Asia, which was part of indosphere of greater India, through the spread of Hinduism and Buddhism from India.  The sembah originated from an ancient greeting of reverence that was done to show neither involves prostration, or clasping the hands palms together and bowing to the ground. The gesture first appears c. 4000 years ago on the clay seals of the Indus Valley Civilization. It is then named as Añjali Mudrā, and endemic to the dharmic culture of Hindu-Buddhist civilization in Indian subcontinent. 

By early first century, Hindu-Buddhist civilization began to exercises their influences in Indonesia, and by the 4th century early Hindu polities has established their rule in Java, Sumatra and Borneo; such as the kingdom of Tarumanagara and Kutai. By the 6th to 9th century, Hindu-Buddhist civilization stood firmly in Java, Bali and Sumatra, as the kingdom of Srivijaya and Medang Mataram rose. The images of sembah or añjali mudrā appear in bas-reliefs of Javanese candis, such as the 9th-century Borobudur and Prambanan temples. From then, the sembah gesture is endemic in the region, especially in Java and Bali.

Social and cultural significance

The sembah is a prescribed etiquette and much-preferred in keratons or Javanese courts of Yogyakarta and Surakarta, where it is particularly important to greet a Javanese king (Sultan or Sunan), princes and nobles in this gesture. Sembah is expected among Javanese aristocratic circle of ningrat and priyayi, where the height of raised clasped-hand corresponds to the social stature of the person in question. The higher sembah hands is raised, the lower the body is bowed, the more higher the social stature of the person revered in this gesture. 
In Javanese court tradition, the pisowanan ngabektèn (Javanese term sowan bhakti; i.e. "visit to offer homage") ceremony is annually held during Lebaran (Eid al-Fitr), when the Javanese kings—the Sultan of the kraton of Yogyakarta and the Sunan of Surakarta—receives the sembah sungkem from their subjects. Sembah sungkem is a kind of sembah that is performed by bowing the body low, then clasping the hands at the lap or knee of the revered person.

Sembah also has become incorporated in standard protocol towards Malay royalty where forehead level is preferred; it is still continued on in Malaysia (particular in functions related to the Yang di-Pertuan Agong) and Brunei.

Sembah is also a common social practice in Bali, where the legacies of Hindu etiquette and customs, are alive and well until today. In Balinese tradition however, the sembah for greeting usually placing joined palms lower than the chin; while the high sembah that rose the clasped palms over the forehead, is usually reserved only for Gods in religious worship purpose, as sembahyang, or known as kramaning sembah while reciting specific mantra.

In Sundanese tradition of West Java, sembah often replacing modern handshake as it done in reciprocated manner; by barely touching each other combined tip of the fingers, then gracefully redraw the clasped hand and raised it to the face until the thumbs touches the tip of one's own nose. Sundanese sembah is also called salam Sunda (Sundanese greetings). 

Within Minangkabau culture of West Sumatra, this greeting gesture is known as salam sembah. While in Jambi, Sumatra, the gesture is called seloko, or seloko salam sembah. 

In Javanese and Sundanese version, usually no words is spoken during performing sembah. In Balinese version however, the word often spoken with the sembah when greeting somebody is om swastiastu, which is cognate to sawatdee in Thai, both originated from Sanskrit svasti. In Sanskrit, the word svasti meaning well, safe, happy, successful and prosperous, and astu means hopefully. Thus Om Swastiastu means: "Oh God, I hope all goodness (safety, happiness and prosperity) comes from all directions." In ancient Indonesia however, it seems that the word "swasti" is said during sembah greeting, as evidence in numbers of stone inscriptions founds in Java and Sumatra that started with the formula svasti in the beginning; such as the 7th-century Kedukan Bukit Inscription that started with: svasti! śrī śakavaŕşātīta 605 ekādaśī śuklapakşa vulan vaiśākha.

Contemporary practice

Today, the sembah greeting is adopted, especially in hospitality industry in Indonesia. Such as performed by Garuda Indonesia flight attendants to greet passenger prior and after the flight, and also commonly practiced as welcome greetings by staffs in hotels, resorts and spas throughout Indonesia.

Sembah greeting gesture is often performed by prominent figures, politicians, state officials, president, VIPs, or important persons during their public visit to greet the attending crowd. This is usually done when approaching and personally greet and handshake each individuals are not possible. During Covid-19 pandemic, this traditional non-contact social greeting is promoted to replace the common handshake to prevent direct contact and also to uphold social distancing.

In dances
The sembah gesture is often performed in ritualized Indonesian traditional dances, such as tari persembahan from Lampung, tanggai dance from Palembang, also its Malay dances variants from Jambi and Riau. In Sundanese, Javanese, and Balinese dances, the sembah gesture often incorporated into dance movements, such as bedhaya, serimpi, topeng, wayang orang, panyembrama and pendet dances.

See also

Sampeah
Wai
Namasté
Sunan
 Culture of Indonesia

References

External links

 Hundred Sculptures of Sembah - the sculptures by Indonesian artist Purjito
 Sembah dance from Lampung

Indonesian culture
Malaysian culture
Greetings
Gestures
Gestures of respect
Indonesian words and phrases
Malay words and phrases
Bowing